Dogodo Bau (born 5 December 1994) is a cricketer from Papua New Guinea. He is a right-handed batsman and a wicket-keeper.

He made his first-class debut for Papua New Guinea against Namibia on 16 October 2016. He made his List A debut against Namibia on 21 October 2016.

International career
Bau made his One Day International (ODI) debut on 4 November 2016 against Hong Kong. He made his Twenty20 International (T20I) debut on 14 April 2017 against the United Arab Emirates.

References

External links

1994 births
Living people
Papua New Guinean cricketers
Papua New Guinea One Day International cricketers
Papua New Guinea Twenty20 International cricketers
People from the National Capital District (Papua New Guinea)
Wicket-keepers